Ffernfael (also spelt Fernmail and many, many variants) is a Welsh male given name. It may refer to:
 "Farinmagil", a 6th-century king who fell at Deorham
 Ffernfael ab Idwal, 8th-century king of Gwent
 Ffernfael ap Tewdwr, 9th-century king of Buellt and Gwytheyrnion
 Ffernfael ap Meurig, 9th-century king of Gwent